MacCallum More and Hudgins House Historic District is a pair of historic homes and national historic district located at Chase City, Mecklenburg County, Virginia. The district encompasses three contributing buildings and one contributing site  They include the Hudqins-Rutledqe House built in 1910.  The house is a two-story, frame dwelling with a symmetrical two-bay façade that combines Colonial Revival and Neoclassical elements.  MacCallum More was designed by noted Richmond architect Carl M. Lindner and built in 1929.  It is Colonial Revival in style with a three-bay, symmetrical façade and a side gable roof.  It has a two-story central block flanked by one-story wings.  Associated with it is a -story, Guest Cottage built about 1941.  The houses are located in landscaped gardens designed by Charles Gillette in 1927.

The property includes the MacCallum More Museum and Gardens.

It was listed on the National Register of Historic Places in 2010.

References

External links
MacCallum More Museum and Gardens - official site

Museums in Mecklenburg County, Virginia
Houses on the National Register of Historic Places in Virginia
Historic districts on the National Register of Historic Places in Virginia
Colonial Revival architecture in Virginia
Houses completed in 1910
Houses completed in 1929
Houses in Mecklenburg County, Virginia
National Register of Historic Places in Mecklenburg County, Virginia
Historic house museums in Virginia
Gardens in Virginia